The First Baptist Church of Orange (also known as First Missionary Baptist Church; Antioch Baptist Church) is a historic Baptist church building at 192 S. Orange Street in Orange, California. The building is currently owned by Avila's El Ranchito, a Mexican restaurant chain based in Orange County.

The church was built in 1893 and modified in 1912 in a Queen Anne—Carpenter Gothic style. The building stopped operating as a church in 1992. It was added to the National Register of Historic Places in 1996.

See also
National Register of Historic Places listings in Orange County, California

References

Baptist churches in California
Churches in Orange County, California
Buildings and structures in Orange, California
National Register of Historic Places in Orange County, California
Churches on the National Register of Historic Places in California
Churches completed in 1912
Carpenter Gothic church buildings in California
Queen Anne architecture in California
Former churches in California
1912 establishments in California